Pinske is a German surname. Notable people with the surname include:

Andrea Pollack (later Pinske; 1961–2019), German swimmer
Bastian Pinske (born 1978), German football player
Michael Pinske (born 1985), German judoka, son of Andrea

See also
Pinsker

German-language surnames